Willem II Vrouwen was the women's football section of Willem II football club from Tilburg, the Netherlands. They were founder members of the Eredivisie Vrouwen in 2007. In February 2011 Willem II announced they were withdrawing support for their women's section, for financial reasons.

Willem II worked together with SC 't Zand from Tilburg.

Results Eredivisie

2010-11 squad

Source: nl.women.soccerway.com

Head coaches
  Edwin Petersen (2007–2009)
  Frans de Kat (2009–2010)
  Peter Coumans (2010–2011)

Former players

References

Willem II (football club)
Women's football clubs in the Netherlands
Eredivisie (women) teams
Association football clubs established in 2007
Association football clubs disestablished in 2011
2007 establishments in the Netherlands
2011 disestablishments in the Netherlands
Football clubs in Tilburg